Oblique  may refer to:
 an alternative name for the character usually called a slash (punctuation) ( / )
Oblique angle, in geometry
Oblique triangle, in geometry
Oblique lattice, in geometry
Oblique leaf base, a characteristic shape of the base of a leaf
Oblique angle, a synonym for Dutch angle, a cinematographic technique
Oblique (album), by jazz vibraphonist Bobby Hutcherson
Oblique (film), a 2008 Norwegian film
Oblique (Vasarely), a 1966 collage, by Victor Vasarely
Oblique banded rattail, a fish also known as a rough-head whiptail
Oblique case, in linguistics
Oblique argument, in linguistics
Oblique correction, in particle physics
Oblique motion, in music
Oblique order, a military formation
Oblique projection, in geometry and drawing, including cavalier and cabinet projection
Oblique reflection, in Euclidean geometry
Oblique shock, in gas dynamics
Oblique type, in typography
Oblique wing, in aircraft design
Oblique icebreaker, a special type of icegoing ship

Anatomy
Oblique arytenoid muscle, in the neck
Oblique cord, near the elbow point
Oblique fissure, separating the inferior and superior lobes of the lungs
Oblique muscle (disambiguation), any of several in the human body

Abdominal muscles
Abdominal external oblique muscle
Abdominal internal oblique muscle
Oblique strain, an injury of either of these muscles, common in baseball

Eye muscles
Inferior oblique muscle
Superior oblique muscle

See also
Obliq, a computer programming language